Galle & Jessen is a Danish chocolate and confectionery brand founded in 1872 and now owned by Toms International.

History
Galle & Jessen was founded as an independent company by Edvard W. Galle (1844-1900) and Hans Jessen (1851-1907). It was initially based in a cellar at Store Kongensgade 6 but relocated to larger premises at Toldbodgade 15 in 1873.

The company was converted into a limited company (aktieselskab) in 1883 and a large new factory at Vibenhus Runddel was inaugurated in 1884. The factory was later expanded several times. The company was acquired by Toms International in 1971.

Products
 
Products marketed under the Galle & Jessen brand include:
 pålægschokolade
 Spunk 
 Ga-Jol pastilles were introduced in 1933.

See also
 C. R. Evers & Co.

References

External links

Brand name confectionery
Danish brands
Danish companies established in 1872
Confectionery companies of Denmark
Throat lozenges